Khaled Ali Nasser Al-Qahtani (born 16 February 1985) is a Kuwaiti footballer currently playing with Kuwaiti club, Al Qadsia.

References

External links
 

1985 births
Living people
Kuwaiti footballers
Qadsia SC players
2015 AFC Asian Cup players
Sportspeople from Kuwait City
Association football defenders
AFC Cup winning players
Kuwait international footballers
Al-Sahel SC (Kuwait) players
Salalah SC players
Kuwait SC players
Expatriate footballers in Oman
Kuwaiti expatriate sportspeople in Oman
Oman Professional League players
Kuwaiti expatriate footballers